Vladimir Vasilevich Zherikhin (22 July 194521 December 2001), of the Paleontological Institute, Russian Academy of Sciences, Moscow, was one of the world's leading paleoentomologists and coleopterists. He worked on the palaeontology of the Coleoptera (beetles) and of insects in general, and on the taxonomy of the weevils (Curculionoidea). 

Zherikhin was one of the lead authors of the multi-authored monograph "Historical development of the class Insecta" edited by his long term collaborators Boris Rohdendorf and Alexandr Pavlovich Rasnitsyn, as well as the much expanded English language "History of Insects", to which he contributed chapters on the patterns of insect burial (taphonomy), past terrestrial ecology, trace fossils, and on thrips and praying mantids.

From 1970 Zherikhin organized field trips to collect fossil insects, and particularly those in Cretaceous and Palaeogene fossil resins, to northernmost Siberia (Taimyr Peninsula), the Russian Far East, and the Caucasus. The objective was to explore changes in the insect world around the Meso-Cenozoic boundary. 

One of Zherikhin's most important collaborations was with his former student Vadim Gratshev. Together they produced numerous papers, most famously their seminal phylogenetic study on the hind wing venation of the weevils, published in a volume celebrating the 80th birthday of Roy Crowson.

References

Russian paleontologists
Russian entomologists
Coleopterists
1945 births
2001 deaths
Scientists from Moscow
Moscow State University alumni
Soviet entomologists
Soviet paleontologists